Sergei Vladimirovich Zolotov (born January 27, 1971) is a Soviet and Russian former professional ice hockey forward. He is a one-time Russian Champion.

Awards and honors

References

External links
 

1971 births
Living people
Krylya Sovetov Moscow players
Kristall Elektrostal players
EC KAC players
Ak Bars Kazan players
HC CSKA Moscow players
Severstal Cherepovets players
Russian ice hockey forwards